Alchesay Flat is a physical feature, named flat, located approximately  north of Whiteriver along Arizona State Route 73 in Navajo County, Arizona.

It is located on the Fort Apache Indian Reservation, and is apparently named for Chief Alchesay of the White Mountain Apache tribe, who is buried there.

From 1959 to 1972 the Alchesay National Fish Hatchery operated there, before it combined with the nearby Williams hatchery.

References

Landforms of Navajo County, Arizona